Slaheddine Hmadi is a Tunisian chess International Master (1982).

Chess career
From the late 1970s to the late 1990s, Slaheddine Hmadi was one of the leading Tunisian chess players.

Slaheddine Hmadi has participated two times in Interzonal Tournaments of the World Chess Championships:
 In 1985 in Tunis ranked 17th place;
 In 1990 in Manila shared 60th - 62nd place.

Slaheddine Hmadi represented the Tunisian team in major team chess tournaments:
 in Chess Olympiad participated 8 times (1978-1980, 1984–1986, 1990-1996);
 in World Team Chess Championship participated in 1985;
 in African Team Chess Championships participated 2 times (1993, 1997) and won individual gold (1993) medal.

Slaheddine Hmadi was awarded the Chess International Master (IM) title in 1982.

References

External links

Slaheddine Hmadi chess games at 365Chess.com

Year of birth missing (living people)
Living people
Chess International Masters
Tunisian chess players
Chess Olympiad competitors